Toasted is the fourth album from Fatso Jetson, released on Bong Load Custom Records.  Originally recorded in 1998, it wasn't completely released until 2001. This album was re-issued on LP in 2012 for the European Tour.

Track listing

Personnel
Mario Lalli – guitar, vocals
Tony Tornay – drums
Larry Lalli – bass
Chris Goss – producer

References

2001 albums
Fatso Jetson albums